The Brenda Howard Memorial Award is an award for activism created in 2005 by the Queens Chapter of PFLAG and named after Brenda Howard. It was the first award by a major American LGBT organization to be named after an openly bisexual person. The award, which is given annually, recognizes an individual whose work on behalf of the bisexual community and the greater LGBT community best exemplifies the vision, principles, and community service exemplified by Howard, and who serves as a positive and visible role model for the entire LGBT community.

Recipients of the award have included a number of notable activists, including Tom Limoncelli, Wendy Curry, Micah Kellner, Robyn Ochs, and H. Sharif Williams.

Recipients

References

American awards
Awards established in 2005
LGBT-related awards